The Egyptian Basketball Super League, also known as the Egyptian Basketball Premier League A, is the top professional basketball division of the Egyptian basketball league system. Administrated by the Egyptian Basketball Federation (EBBFED), it is contested by 16 teams, with the two lowest-placed teams relegated to the Egyptian Basketball Premier League B and replaced by the top two teams in that division.

A total of five clubs have been crowned champions of the Egyptian Basketball Super League since its inception in 1972, with Zamalek winning the title a record 15 times and Al Ittihad 13 times, though the Egyptian Basketball Super League also saw other champions, including Gezira (11 times), Al Ahly (6 times) and Sporting (3 times). The champions of each season qualify for the Basketball Africa League (BAL) regular season.

Clubs 
The 16 teams of the 2020–21 season:

Titles by club

Champions

References

External links
Egyptian basketball at Asia-Basket.com

 

Basketball competitions in Egypt
Basketball leagues in Africa